Deepali (Hindi : दीपाली) is a Hindu/Sanskrit Indian feminine given name, which means "joy", "happiness into one's life"

Notable people named Deepali 
 Deepali Deshpande (born August 3, 1969), Indian sport shooter.
 Deepali Kishore (born January 6, 1989), Indian singer.
 Deepali Pansare (born July 3, 1984), Indian singer.
 Deepali Pant Joshi (born December 12, 1957), Indian banker, businesswoman and doctor.
Deepali Rane

Notable people named Dipali 
 Dipali Barthakur (born January 30, 1941), Indian singer.
 Dipali Cunningham (born August 27, 1958), Australian ultramarathon woman runner.

Others 
 Dipali Kumari, a 2008 TV Shortland Street fictional character.

Hindu given names
Indian feminine given names